The 2017–18 Vancouver Canucks season was the 48th season for the National Hockey League (NHL) franchise that was established on May 22, 1970. The Canucks missed the Stanley Cup playoffs for the third consecutive season. This was the last season for both Henrik and Daniel Sedin, who both announced their retirements on April 2, 2018, after 18-season NHL careers.

Standings

Schedule and results

Preseason
The preseason schedule was released on June 14, 2017.

Regular season
The regular season schedule was published on June 22, 2017.

Detailed records

Player statistics
Final stats

Skaters

Goaltenders

†Acquired by Canucks mid-season. Statistics reflect time with Canucks only.
‡Denotes player was traded mid-season. Statistics reflect time with the Canucks only.

Awards and honours

Awards

Milestones

Records

Suspensions/fines

Transactions
The Canucks have been involved in the following transactions during the 2017–18 season.

Trades

Free agents acquired

Free agents lost

Claimed via waivers

Lost via waivers

Players released

Lost via retirement

Player signings

Draft picks

Below are the Vancouver Canucks' selections at the 2017 NHL Entry Draft, which was held on June 23 and 24, 2017 at the United Center in Chicago.

Draft notes

 The Columbus Blue Jackets' second-round pick went to the Vancouver Canucks as compensation for Columbus hiring John Tortorella as their head coach on October 21, 2015.
 The Carolina Hurricanes' fifth-round pick went to the Vancouver Canucks as the result of a trade on June 24, 2017, that sent San Jose's fourth-round pick in 2017 (112th overall) to Chicago in exchange for a sixth-round pick in 2017 (181st overall) and this pick.
 The Chicago Blackhawks' sixth-round pick went to the Vancouver Canucks as the result of a trade on June 24, 2017, that sent San Jose's fourth-round pick in 2017 (112th overall) to Chicago in exchange for Carolina's fifth-round pick in 2017 (135th overall) and this pick.

References

Vancouver Canucks seasons
Vancouver Canucks
Vancou